José Manuel González Hernández (born October 6, 1981 in San Miguel, El Salvador) is a Salvadoran professional football player who plays as a goalkeeper.

Club career

Dragón 
Nicknamed El Meme, González started his career at his hometown club Dragón with whom he played in the Segunda División as well as at the Primera División.

Vista Hermosa 
After 9 years he moved on to Vista Hermosa, and in 2008 he signed for FAS, only to return to Vista Hermosa after one season.

With the team of San Francisco Gotera, González Hernández won the Apertura 2005 against Isidro Metapán (2–0 victory).

In December 2010, he extended his contract with Vista Hermosa after being linked to UES and was voted best goalkeeper of the national league, together with Juan José Gómez.

UES 
After leaving Vista Hermosa because of the economic situation of the team in 2012 González signed with UES. Months later González signed with Águila.

Return to Dragón 
In 2013, he returned to play with Dragón, being an important piece and reaching the final of the Clausura 2014 with the team of San Miguel but losing it against Isidro Metapán in the penalties with González in the goal. However, Dragón reached the final of the Clausura 2016 tournament and defeated Águila 1–0 with González again in the goal.

Months later, in a surprising way, Dragón was in danger of descending for the Clausura 2017 tournament, but getting saved in the last game of the season against Águila.

Luis Ángel Firpo 
After that González left the team and signed with Luis Ángel Firpo in 2017. Months later returned to Dragón, but the team ended descending in the Clausura 2018 in the middle of an administrative and economic crisis.

Municipal Limeño 
Gonzaléz signed with Municipal Limeño in the Apertura 2018 tournament. With Municipal Limeño, González reached the quarter-finals of the Apertura 2018 but they were eliminated by Santa Tecla 2–3 on aggregate.

International career
Gónzález made his debut for El Salvador in a January 2007 friendly match against Denmark and has earned a total of 3 caps, scoring no goals. He has represented his country at the 2007 UNCAF Nations Cup where he played his final international match against Guatemala.

References

1981 births
Living people
People from San Miguel, El Salvador
Association football goalkeepers
Salvadoran footballers
El Salvador international footballers
C.D. Vista Hermosa footballers
C.D. FAS footballers
C.D. Dragón footballers